Rhode Island Sound is a strait of water off the coast of the U.S. state of Rhode Island at the mouth of Narragansett Bay. It forms the eastern extension of Block Island Sound and opens out the Atlantic Ocean between Block Island and Martha's Vineyard.

Geography
Geographically, Rhode Island Sound is the eastward extension of Block Island Sound. Northeast of Rhode Island Sound is Buzzards Bay. Circulation and current strength are mostly impacted by the surrounding geology and not by wind strength. This causes the sea floor habitats in the Rhode Island Sound to be constantly changing.

Sedimentary processes
Studies conducted in 2006 by the Coastal Marine and Geology Program and the Long Island Sound Resource Center used digital terrain models to make topographical depictions of unknown glacial features and bedforms. Newfound glacial features include an ice-sculptured bedrock surface, residual stagnant-ice-contact deposits, a recessional moraine, and exposed glaciolacustrine sediments. Modern bedforms consist of fields of transverse sand waves, barchanoid waves, giant scour depressions, and pockmarks). Bedform asymmetry from multibeam bathymetric data indicate that net sediment transport is westward across the northern part of the study area near Fishers Island, and eastward across the southern part near Great Gull Island. Compared to the Block Island Sound, the Rhode Island Sound is more prone to stratification since water currents are less dynamic in this area.

Flora and fauna

Algal and kelp growth
Kelp population density is higher in the Rhode Island Sound compared to other temperate locations, particularly locations north of Rhode Island. However, even though annual kelp production is higher, the productivity of individual plants is lower due to lower biomass accumulation of fucoid algae. Studies conducted by Pilson, Asare, and Harlin between 1983 and 1985 illustrated that algal species such as Laminaria saccharina living in Rhode Island Sound waters have maximum nitrogen accumulation in their tissues, which directly correlates with maximum ambient inorganic nitrogen levels in tissues of other algal species as well. The cause of this is majorly impacted by large temporal fluctuations in the Rhode Island waters.

Invasive species
In 2008, research conducted by the University of Rhode Island, Graduate School of Oceanography, shows that there is an increase in the abundance of a tunicate species, Didemnum. The species has been spotted in the Rhode Island Sound area since 2000, but has been rapidly increasing in numbers ever since. Two certain species of jellyfish are currently having a population explosion within these waters. Mnemiopsis leidyi, commonly known as sea walnut comb jellies, and the Lion's mane jellyfish (Cyanea capillata), are disrupting habitats with their invasive behavior in the Rhode Island Sound waters.

References

Straits of Rhode Island
Intracoastal Waterway
Bodies of water of Newport County, Rhode Island
Bodies of water of Washington County, Rhode Island